Rita Chałubińska (born in 1980 in Łódź) is a  former Polish figure skater. She competed in both singles and pairs. Her pairs partner was Sławomir Borowiecki.

Competitive highlights

Ladies singles

Pairs
(with Borowiecki)

Sources
Results Archive
Results Archive
Skatebase
Pairs on Ice

1981 births
Polish female single skaters
Polish female pair skaters
Living people
Sportspeople from Łódź